Conviva is a venture-backed, privately held company, offering services for online video optimization and online video analytics. Conviva is headquartered in Silicon Valley with offices in New York and London.

History
The company was founded as Rinera Networks in 2006 by Hui Zhang and  Ion Stoica. The company changed its name from Rinera Networks to Conviva in April 2008.
 
In 2012, Conviva won AlwaysOn Global 250 top private innovative technology companies. $15 million was raised from Time Warner Investments in February 2012.

In 2013, Conviva raised $44 million from Foundation Capital, GGV, and New Enterprise Associates.

In 2017, Conviva raised $40 million, with participation from investors such as Future Fund, NEA, Foundation Capital, and Time Warner Investments.

Technology
Conviva sells a control platform said to pre-emptively locate video streaming issues and make adjustments to avoid buffering and low quality. Conviva also provides online video analytics on viewer engagement and video performance.

In February 2013, Conviva launched a Viewer Experience Report, analyzing 22.6 billion streams globally throughout 2012. Conviva’s data discovered that 39.9% of their customer’s online video streams experienced buffering in 2012. Their data claimed that on average audiences watch 250% more video when there's lower buffering, quicker start time and higher bitrate.

In 2013, Conviva analyzed global data from 45 billion video streams, seen across more than 1.6 billion individual devices and on more than 400 premium media video players. .

Partners
Conviva works with media brands including HBO ESPN, AEG, Vevo, NBC, Turner, Disney, Yahoo, Sky, and Hulu. The company has worked on live streaming events including The World Cup, The Super Bowl,
2010 Vancouver Winter Olympics, March Madness, Wimbledon, and The Masters, In February 2013, Conviva announced a six-year agreement with HBO GO to provide data and video delivery optimization for their HBO GO TV Everywhere platform.

Conviva has partnerships with leading Online Video Platform (OVP) companies including Brightcove thePlatform  and others. Conviva also partners with content delivery networks (CDN) including Limelight Networks

References

Online mass media companies of the United States